Protepiptera is a genus of fossil planthoppers belonging to the family Achilidae.

The species of this genus are found as inclusions in amber on the coasts of southern Baltic Sea.

Species
Species:

Protepiptera kaweckii 
Protepiptera reticulata

References

Achilidae
Hemiptera genera